I'm Mad may refer to:

"I'm Mad" (song), a song written by Willie Mabon
"I'm Mad", a song by Bill Wyman's Rhythm Kings from the album Struttin' Our Stuff
"I'm Mad", a song by EPMD from the album Business as Usual
"I'm Mad", a song by the Presidents of the United States of America from the album Freaked Out and Small
"I'm Mad", a song by Slaughter and the Dogs from the album Do It Dog Style
I'm Mad, a 1994 Animaniacs short film